Acacia ampliceps, also known as salt wattle, is a shrub or tree  belonging to the genus Acacia and the subgenus Phyllodineae that is native to north western parts of Australia.

Description
It has pendulous, yellow-coloured and glabrous branchlets. It blooms from May to August and produces cream flowers.

Taxonomy
The species was first formally described by the botanist Bruce Maslin in 1974 as part of the work Studies in the genus Acacia Miscellaneous new phyllodinous species as published in the journal Nuytsia. It was reclassified as Racosperma ampliceps by Leslie Pedley in 2003 then transferred back to the genus Acacia in 2006.

Distribution
It is endemic to an area in the Northern Territory and the Kimberley and  Pilbara regions of Western Australia where it occurs along watercourses and in floodplains, on coastal sand dunes and salt flats growing in sandy soils.

See also
List of Acacia species

References

ampliceps
Acacias of Western Australia
Plants described in 1974
Flora of the Northern Territory
Taxa named by Bruce Maslin